The Victoria Station and Pimlico Railway was an early British railway company which was incorporated by Act of Parliament 23 July 1858. to build a railway line connecting the existing London Brighton and South Coast Railway (LB&SCR) terminus in Battersea to a new terminal at London Victoria station in Westminster. This involved constructing the Grosvenor Bridge over the river Thames. The company later leased its lines and stations to the LB&SCR and the London Chatham and Dover Railway (LC&DR) but continued in existence until December 1922 when it was briefly amalgamated with the South Eastern Railway as a result of the Railways Act 1921, which created the Big Four on 1 January 1923.

Origins
The railway was originally created to provide a West End of London terminus for the LB&SCR and three British railways which already had access to, or were planning to use the misnamed ‘Pimlico’ station of the LB&SCR, (which was actually sited in Battersea). These were the Great Western Railway (GWR), the London and North Western Railway (L&NWR), and the East Kent Railway, which would soon afterwards become the London Chatham and Dover Railway (LC&DR). The new company had an authorised capital of £1 million 45% of which was subscribed by LB&SCR. It was empowered to make agreements with the LC&DR and GWR, for these two companies to pay an agreed rent in perpetuity. The Brighton Company was to have custody and regulation of the line

A further bill of 1859 enabled the widening of the proposed lines and for the L&NWR and  GWR to subscribe £100,000 each, towards the cost of construction.

Completion
The line was completed and the LB&SCR side of Victoria station opened in the basin of the Grosvenor Canal on 1 October 1860. and leased to the LB&SCR which company had also promoted a bill enabling it to amalgamate with the VS&PR. However this was opposed by the GWR and LC&DR and rejected by Parliament. An agreement was made to widen the lines and bridges to separate the two main users, which was completed in 1862/3.  The LC&DR and GWR station at Victoria (which also provided running powers for the L&NWR) was opened 25 August 1862

Absorption
The VS&PR continued in existence until 14 December 1922 when it was absorbed by the South Eastern Railway as a result of the Railways Act 1921, prior to the creation of the Southern Railway on 1 January 1923.

References

Early British railway companies
Railway companies established in 1858
Railway lines opened in 1860
1858 establishments in England
British companies established in 1858